Apchon is a commune in the Cantal department in the Auvergne region of south-central France.

The inhabitants of the commune are known as Apchonnais or Apchonnaises.

Geography
Apchon is located some 80 km south-west of Clermont-Ferrand, 25 km north-west of Murat, and 30 km south-east of Bort-les-Orgues. Access is by the D3 road from Riom-ès-Montagnes in the north-west passing through the north of the commune to Murat in the south-east. Access to the village is by the D49 which branches off the D3 north-east of the commune and passes through the village then south to Saint-Hippolyte. There is also the D249 from the village south-west to join the D263 south of Collandres. Apart from the village there are also the hamlets of La Ribeyre and La Vidal along the D3, and Brechailles on the north-east. Apart from some patches of forest in the north the commune is entirely farmland.

The Petite Rhue river flows from south to north through the commune and continues to join the Grande Rhue river at Coindre. The Ruisseau de Brechailles flows from the south-east to join the Petite Rhue north of the D3. The Ruisseau de Mazeyres rises in the south of the commune and flows into the Petite Rhue on the left bank. Several small streams rise in the west of the commune and flow north-west eventually joining and flowing into the Veronne.

Neighbouring communes and villages

Heraldry

Administration

List of successive mayors

Population

Sites and monuments
The Château fort d'Apchon (12th century) is registered as an historical monument.

The Church contains several items that are registered as historical objects:
An Altar, Retable, and Statue (17th century)
An Altar, Retable, 2 Statues, and a Bust-Reliquary (17th century)
An Altar, Retable, and 2 Group Sculptures (17th century)
A Statue: Virgin and child (15th century)
A Retable in the main Altar (18th century)
2 Sarcophagii (11th century)

Views of Apchon

See also
Communes of the Cantal department

References

External links
Apchon on the National Geographic Institute website 
Apchon on Géoportail, National Geographic Institute (IGN) website 
Apchon on the 1750 Cassini Map

Communes of Cantal